Reset is the name of an extended play (EP) album by Mutemath. Reset is the band's first release. It was released September 28, 2004 by a division of Warner Music Group. The album went out of print in the US in 2006, but was re-released in the UK on July 23, 2007.

Track listing
(all songs written by Paul Meany and Darren King except where noted)
"Control" (Meany, King, Adam LaClave) – 4:36
"Peculiar People" (Meany, Jonathan Foreman, King) – 4:35
"OK" – 5:23
"Reset" – 5:25
"Plan B" – 4:46
"Progress" – 4:45
"Afterward" – 1:19

Personnel
 Paul Meany – rhodes piano, bass, vocals
 Darren King – drums, samples, programming
 Greg Hill – guitar
 Jonathan Allen – bass on tracks "Control" and "Peculiar People"
 Dave Rumsey – additional guitar on "Plan B"

Release history

2004 debut EPs
Mutemath albums
Word Records EPs